H. crispa may refer to:
 Helvella crispa, a fungus species
 Hennedya crispa, an alga species in the genus Hennedya
 Herissantia crispa, a flowering plant species
 Heteractis crispa, a sea anemone species

See also
 Crispa (disambiguation)